Universal Order of Armageddon was an American hardcore band, active from 1992 to 1994 and reformed in 2010.

History
The band formed in September 1992. By early 1993, after quickly gaining a small but devoted following, they recorded and toured the East Coast. They became known for their extreme short chaotic performances, which sometimes resulted in complete destruction. Larry Livermore (founder of Lookout! Records) was so impressed by their live performance that he stated in a magazine column that punk bands should take note of U.O.A. and bring back this type of energy into punk rock. Drummer Brooks Headley once said, "Our live shows are like turning on a vacuum cleaner for like ten minutes". They went on to release records on indie labels such as Kill Rock Stars, Gravity, and Jade Tree.  They toured the United States several times in 1993 and 1994 in support of those releases before breaking up in late 1994.

Following the band's demise, Joy and Malat started the group The Great Unraveling, and Headley went on to play in the group's final lineup. Seven moved to Seattle, Washington in 2007. He spent from October 2009 to May 2010 riding his motorcycle from Seattle to Argentina.

The four original members of the group played a series of shows in July 2010.  This was followed by further live performances announced for the following January.

Band members
 Tonie Joy – guitar (Born Against, The Convocation, The Great Unraveling, Lava, Moss Icon)
 Brooks Headley – drums (Born Against, Skull Kontrol, (Young) Pioneers, Wrangler Brutes)
 Colin Seven – vocals (UV-373, Blue Condors, Baby Aspirin, The Blue Humours)
 Anthony Scott Malat – bass (The Great Unraveling, Love Life, Bellmer Dolls, clothing designer)

Former members
 Christian Sturgis – bass (for final few 1994 shows)

Discography
Singles and albums
 1993 – S/T 7" (Vermin Scum)
 1993 – Symptom 7" (JT1013)
 1993 – Split 7" with Born Against (Gravity 5)
 1994 – The Switch Is Down 12" EP (KRS224EP)
 1994 – Self-Titled 12" (Gravity 12)
 1996 – Discography CD (KRS224)

Compilation appearances
 1994 – Rock Stars Kill compilation CD (Kill Rock Stars)
 1994 – A History Of Compassion And Justice (with Los Crudos, Ottawa, John Henry West, Dead and Gone, Manumission, and Naked Aggression) 7" (Lengua Armada)

References

American post-hardcore musical groups
Musical groups established in 1992
Musical groups from Baltimore
Jade Tree (record label) artists